MinEd (pronounced min-ed) is a terminal-based text editor providing extensive Unicode and CJK support, available under the GPL.

Mined is available for Unix and Linux, Windows, DOS, and VMS systems.

Features 

Mined is a modeless editor, with menus and mouse support, and key bindings optimized for intuitive and fast navigation (optionally using control key bindings or various editors).

It fully supports Unicode, including combining characters and bi-directional text, as well as converting to and from a large number of legacy encodings.

Mined also contains functionality usually only found in word processors, such as smart quotes.

File management 

Mined has an interactive file chooser; backup files (optionally versioned), file locking and recovery files which are interoperable with other editors, and file change monitoring.

See also 
 List of text editors
 Comparison of text editors

References

External links
 

Free software programmed in C
Unix text editors
MacOS text editors
Free text editors
DOS text editors